Marie Ohlsson is a Swedish ski-orienteering competitor and World Champion. She won a gold medal in the relay at the 2009 World Ski Orienteering Championships, with the team members Helene Söderlund and Josefine Engström.

References

Swedish orienteers
Female orienteers
Ski-orienteers
Year of birth missing (living people)
Living people